Pratt is an English surname. Notable people with the surname include:

A–F
 Abner Pratt (1801–1863), American diplomat, jurist, politician, lawyer
 Al Pratt (baseball) (1847–1937), American baseball player
 Andy Pratt (baseball) (born 1979), American baseball player
 Andy Pratt (singer-songwriter) (born 1947), American singer-songwriter and musician
 Antwerp Edgar Pratt (1852-1924), British naturalist, explorer, collector of plants and animals
 Awadagin Pratt (born 1966), American concert pianist
 Babe Pratt (Walter Peter Pratt, 1916–1988), Canadian ice hockey player
 Betty Rosenquest Pratt, (1925–2016), American tennis player
 Bob Pratt (1912–2001), Australian rules footballer
 Caleb S. Pratt (1832–1861), Union Army officer
 Calvin Edward Pratt (1828–1896), Union Army officer
 Charles Pratt, 1st Earl Camden (1713–1794), British lawyer
 Charles Pratt (1830–1891), American businessman and philanthropist
 Chris Pratt (born 1979), American actor
 Christopher Pratt (born 1935), Canadian artist
 Daniel Pratt (eccentric) (1809–1887), American speaker, author, performance artist, eccentric, and poet
 Daniel Pratt (industrialist) (1799–1873), American industrialist
 David Pratt (Canadian broadcaster) (late 20th/early 21st c.), Canadian sports radio personality and columnist
 David Pratt (assassin) (1908–1961), attempted assassin of South African Prime Minister Hendrik Verwoerd
 David Pratt (cricketer) (born 1938), English cricketer
 David Pratt (footballer) (1896–1967), Scottish football player and manager
 David Pratt (politician) (born 1955), Canadian politician
 Denis Charles Pratt (1908–1999), British writer, illustrator, actor, and artist's model, commonly known as Quentin Crisp
 Don Pratt (1892–1944), United States Army officer
 Dudley Pratt (1897–1975), American sculptor
 E. J. Pratt (1882–1964), Canadian poet
 Edmund T. Pratt Jr. (1927–2002), American CEO
 Eliza Jane Pratt (1902–1981), American politician
 Enoch Pratt (1808–1896), American businessman
 Fletcher Pratt (1897–1956), historian and science fiction/fantasy author
 Francis A. Pratt (1827–1902), American engineer, of the Pratt & Whitney aircraft engine company
 Frederick Haven Pratt (1873–1958), American professor of physiology

G–J
 Gary Pratt (born 1981), English cricketer
 George C. Pratt (born 1928), U.S. federal appellate judge
 George Dupont Pratt (1869–1935), environmentalist
 George Pratt (disambiguation), several people
 George Pratt, 2nd Marquess Camden (1799–1866), British peer and Tory politician
 Germaine Pratt (born 1998), American football player
 Greta Pratt (born 1960), American photographer
 Harold Douglas Pratt Jr. (born 1944), American ornithologist, bio acoustician, wildlife photographer, bird illustrator, and musician
 Henry Cheever Pratt (1803–1880), American artist and explorer
 Henry Otis Pratt (1838–1931), American lawyer, minister, and Iowa Republican U.S. Representative
 Herbert L. Pratt (1871–1945), American oil industrialist
 Hiram Pratt (1800–1840), American politician from Buffalo, New York
 Hodgson Pratt (1824–1907), British pacifist
 Hugo Pratt (1927–1995), Italian cartoonist
 Jane Pratt (born 1962), American magazine editor
 Jerome Pratt (1926–1984), American politician
 Jessica Pratt (musician) (born 1987), American singer-songwriter
 Jessica Pratt (soprano) (born 1979), Australian operatic soprano
 John Pratt (disambiguation), several people
 John Pratt (footballer) (born 1948), English footballer
 John Pratt (judge) (1657–1725), Lord Chief Justice of England and interim Chancellor of the Exchequer
 John Pratt (soldier) (1753–1824), United States Army officer
 John Pratt, 1st Marquess Camden (1759–1840), British politician
 John Teele Pratt (1873–1927), American corporate attorney, philanthropist, music impresario, and financier
 John Pratt (1931–2001), birth name of author John Winton
 John H. Pratt (1910–1995), U.S. court of appeals judge
 John Henry Pratt (1809–1871), British clergyman and mathematician
 John Lee Pratt (1879–1975), American businessman who served on GM's Board of Directors
 John Pratt (Canadian politician) (1894–1973), Manitoban politician
 John Pratt (Liberal politician) (1873–1952), Scottish Liberal politician
 John Pratt (cricketer) (1834–1886), English cricketer
 Joseph Marmaduke Pratt (1891–1946), American politician
 Judson Pratt (1916–2002), American actor

K–Q
 Keith Pratt
 Keri Lynn Pratt (born 1978), American actress
 Khevin Pratt (born 1970), American football player
 Kyla Pratt (born c. 1985), American actress
 Kyle Pratt, a player on the 2008 Florida Gators football team
 Larry Pratt (baseball) (1887–1969), American baseball player
 Larry Pratt (born 1942), American lobbyist
 Lorus Pratt (1855–1923), American artist
 Louise Pratt (born 1972), Australian politician
 Marvin Pratt (born 1944), American politician
 Mary Louise Pratt (20th c.), professor of Spanish and Portuguese languages and literature
 Mary Pratt (disambiguation), several people
 Mary Pratt (baseball) (born 1918), American baseball player
 Mary Pratt (painter) (born 1935), Canadian painter
 Matthew Pratt (1734–1805), American painter
 Michael Pratt (disambiguation), several people
 Lord Michael Pratt (1946–2007), British author
 Michael Pratt (American football) (born c. 2002), American football quarterback
 Michael Kenneth Pratt (born 1954), Australian policeman
 Mike Pratt (actor) (1931–1976), British actor
 Mike Pratt (basketball) (1948–2022), American basketball player, coach, and broadcaster
 Mike Pratt (politician) (born 1948), Australian politician as the Member for Adelaide
 Neisha Pratt (born 1973), Hong Kong cricketer
 Nicole Pratt (born 1973), Australian tennis player
 Nolan Pratt (born 1975), Canadian ice hockey player and assistant coach
 Orson Pratt (1811–1881), Latter Day Saint leader, brother of Parley P. Pratt
 Parley P. Pratt (1807–1857), Latter Day Saint writer, brother of Orson Pratt
 Percy Pratt (1874–1961), New Zealand cricketer
 Peter Pratt (1923–1995), British actor
 Phil Pratt (born 1942), Jamaican singer and record producer

R–Z
 Renée Gill Pratt (born 1954), American politician and convicted felon
 Reverend George Pratt (1817–1894), missionary, author of the first Samoan language grammar and dictionary
 Rey Pratt (1878–1931), Latter Day Saint leader in Mexico
 Richard Henry Pratt (1840–1924), American soldier and educator, founder of Carlisle Indian School
 Richard L. Pratt Jr. (born 1953), American Calvinist theologian and author
 Richard Pratt (Australian businessman) (1934–2009), Australian businessman
 Robert (1870–1935) and Henry (1863–1943) Pratt, Canadian settlers
 Rodney Pratt (born 1938), English cricketer
 Roger Pratt (architect) (1620–1684), English architect
 Samuel Jackson Pratt (1749–1814), English writer
 Samuel Pratt (1807 – c. 1875), American farmer and politician
 Sharon Pratt Kelly (born 1944), American politician
 Spencer Pratt (born 1983), American television personality
 Susan May Pratt (born 1974), American actress
 Susan Pratt (born 1956), American actress
 Theodore Pratt (1901–1969), American novelist
 Thomas Pratt (Maryland politician) (1804–1869), American lawyer and politician
 Thomas Willis Pratt (1812–1875), American engineer and inventor
 Tim Pratt (born 1976), American science fiction and fantasy writer and poet
 Todd Pratt (born 1967), American baseball player, manager, and coach
 Tom Pratt (American football) (born 1935), American football player and coach
 Travis Pratt, American criminologist
 Vaughan Pratt (born 1944), computer scientist
 Victoria Pratt (born 1970), Canadian actress
 Wallace Pratt (1885–1981), American geologist
 Walter F. Pratt (born 1946), American legal scholar
 Walter L. Pratt (1868–1934), New York politician
 William Henry Pratt (1887–1969), birth name of actor Boris Karloff
 William V. Pratt (1869–1957), American admiral
 Zadock Pratt (1790–1871), US congressman and founder of Prattsville, New York

Fictional characters 
 Atom (Al Pratt), comics character
 George Pratt, character in Philip Van Doren Stern's short story "The Greatest Gift"
 Greg Pratt, character from ER
 Kyle Pratt, a character in Flightplan
 Upson Pratt in the movie Creepshow
 William Pratt or Spike, a character from Buffy the Vampire Slayer
 Michaela Pratt, fictional character played by Aja Naomi King (List of How to Get Away with Murder characters)

See also 
 Killing of Olivia Pratt-Korbel
 Tierra Ruffin-Pratt (born 1991), American basketball player
 Pratz (disambiguation)

English-language surnames